Lynn Varley is an American comic book colorist, notable for her collaborations with her then-husband, comic book writer/artist Frank Miller.

Biography
Varley grew up in Livonia, Michigan. Moving to New York City, she found work at Neal Adams' Continuity Associates. She debuted as a comic book colorist on Batman Annual # 8 (1982), written by Mike W. Barr and penciled by her then partner Trevor Von Eeden. Around the same time, she became professionally involved with Upstart Associates, a shared studio space on West 29th Street formed by Walter Simonson, Howard Chaykin, Val Mayerik, and Jim Starlin. Varley colored the first two issues of Chaykin's American Flagg! Frank Miller later became part of Upstart.

Varley provided the coloring for Miller's Ronin (1984), an experimental six-issue series from DC Comics that proved that comics in unusual formats could be commercially successful; and The Dark Knight Returns (1986), a four issue mini-series that went on to become an outstanding commercial and critical success. Miller also noted that Varley helped create the futuristic slang that Carrie Kelley and other characters use.

Subsequently, Varley colored other Miller books, including The Dark Knight Strikes Again, 300, Elektra Lives Again, Big Guy and Rusty the Boy Robot (with Geoff Darrow), as well as a number of covers for the U.S. editions of the Lone Wolf and Cub series. She also colored the backgrounds for the 300 movie (2007), produced by Miller.

Varley has only worked sporadically in the comics industry since 2005.

Personal life 
Varley and Miller were married from 1986 to 2005. They moved from New York City to Los Angeles in the late 1980s and moved back to New York shortly before the September 11 attacks.

Style and technique 
Varley’s coloring technique evolved to be greatly influenced by the introduction of software programs such as Adobe Photoshop.  In the early 2000s, when Varley and Miller released The Dark Knight Strikes Again, Varley's coloring included vibrant and nearly psychedelic coloring styles, vastly different from the subtler tones used in The Dark Knight Returns. Some critics argued that Varley's inexperience with the new technology negatively affected her work, and that she would have been better off using a real brush.  As comics have subsequently continued to feature more vibrant color schemes, however, Varley's earlier work has also been heralded by some as ahead of its time.

Awards
Varley has received recognition in the comics industry, particularly in 1999, when she won the Harvey Award, the Eisner Award, and the Comics Buyer's Guide Awards for Favorite Colorist. (She also won the CBG award in 1986 and 2000.)

Notes

References

External links
 

Eisner Award winners for Best Coloring
Harvey Award winners for Best Colorist
American female comics artists
Living people
American women artists
Comics colorists
Year of birth missing (living people)